The Ambassador from Israel to Slovenia is Israel's foremost diplomatic representative in Slovenia.

List of ambassadors
Eyal Sela (Non-Resident, Jerusalem) 2017 - 
Shmuel Meirom (Non-Resident, Jerusalem) 2010 - 2016 
Aviv Shir-On (Non-Resident, Vienna) 2009 - 2010
Dan Ashbel (Non-Resident, Vienna) 2006 - 2009
Yael Rubinstein (Non-Resident, Jerusalem) 2003 - 2005
David Granit (Non-Resident, Jerusalem) 2001 - 2003
Yosef Govrin (Non-Resident, Vienna) 1993 - 1995

References

Slovenia
Israel